Valmir Furlani or simply Valmir (born 28 May 1969) is a Brazilian former professional football right-back.

Career
Born in Taquaritinga, São Paulo, Valmir began playing football in with local side Clube Atlético Taquaritinga, where he would be voted the best right-back in the 1988 Campeonato Paulista Série A2. He joined Guarani Futebol Clube shortly after winning the award, and spent seven years with the club making several appearances in Campeonato Brasileiro Série A.

Valmir spent the next three seasons playing for Santa Cruz Futebol Clube, Esporte Clube Bahia and Associação Atlética Ponte Preta. He finished his playing career at several smaller clubs, Associação Atlética Internacional (Limeira), Grêmio Esportivo Sãocarlense, Clube de Regatas Brasil, Anápolis Futebol Clube, Clube Recreativo e Atlético Catalano, Grêmio Esportivo Novorizontino and Jaboticabal Atlético.

After he retired from playing, Valmir began coaching football. He has managed the youth and reserve sides of Taquaritinga.

References

External links
Valmir at playmakerstats.com (English version of ogol.com.br)

1969 births
Living people
Brazilian footballers
Guarani FC players
Santa Cruz Futebol Clube players
Esporte Clube Bahia players
Associação Atlética Ponte Preta players
Association football defenders
Footballers from São Paulo (state)
People from Taquaritinga